Tarapuram or Tharapuram is a Village and Gram panchayat in Ramabhadrapuram mandal of Vizianagaram district, Andhra Pradesh, India.

References

Villages in Vizianagaram district

Government and politics

Tarapuram village is one of the villages in Ramabhadrapuram (Mandal headquarters), which in turn is a part of Vizianagaram (Lok Sabha constituency), one of the 25 Lok Sabha constituencies representing Andhra Pradesh.[3] The present MLA is Venkata Sujay Krishna Ranga Rao Ravu, who won the Andhra Pradesh Legislative Assembly election, 2014 representing Yuvajana Sramika Rythu Congress Party.[4][5]